"Good Old Days", is a 1930 tune written by Leroy Shield (October 2, 1893 – January 9, 1962) which was the theme song for Hal Roach's Our Gang comedies, now known as The Little Rascals. The tune was originally written for Teacher's Pet where it was used repeatedly, and then was used in every subsequent Little Rascals comedy. The tune caught on immediately, and NBC Radio Network show Kaltenmeyer's Kindergarten also set lyrics to the melody. Laurel & Hardy used the tune in a prison schoolroom scene for their comedy Pardon Us. The tune was among those revived by modern Swing artists The Beau Hunks for their Leroy Shield tribute album in 1992.

"Kaltenmeyer's startin',
Let's all go to school,
In this kindergarten,
Where nonsense is the rule,
Boy do we pull boners,
Mischief we all raise,
Laugh of it and you'll admit,
We're in the good old days"

References

1930 songs
Our Gang
Film theme songs
Comedy television theme songs
Children's television theme songs